The Old Courthouse in Howth is a former place of worship that was subsequently used as a courthouse. It was built around 1845 and used as a place of worship for fishermen, then later used as a rent collection office by agents of Lord Howth. By 1870 it was used as a local courthouse and it continued as one until 1970.  It is at the junction of Harbour Road and Church Street. It is a protected structure under Part IV of the Planning & Development Act 2000 with RPS 567. It is part of the Howth Historic Core Architectural Statement of Character.

It was due to be refurbished in early 2020 as a tourist centre.

References

External links
 Building entry on National Inventory of Architectural Heritage

Howth
Buildings listed on the Fingal Record of Protected Structures